
Laguna Rodeo is a lake in the Cochabamba Department, Bolivia. At an elevation of 3485 m, its surface area is 0.2 km². It is 19 km by road to the Lake Corani major tourist center and fishing.

References 

Lakes of Cochabamba Department